Marco De Rossi (born 27 June 1997) is a Sammarinese tennis player.

De Rossi has a career high ATP singles ranking of 1524 achieved on 17 December 2018.

De Rossi represents San Marino at the Davis Cup, where he has a W/L record of 17–23.

De Rossi was just 15 years old when he received a wildcard into the 2012 San Marino Open qualifying draw where he won the first round of qualifying but was double-bageled in the next round. 9 years later, De Rossi made ATP Challenger Tour debut at the 2021 San Marino Open after receiving a wildcard into the singles and doubles main draw. He played the second seed and former world number 6 Gilles Simon in the first round but lost in straight sets.

References

External links

1997 births
Living people
Sammarinese male tennis players
People from the City of San Marino